Karolina Wlodarczak (born 27 June 1987) is an Australian former professional tennis player. Her highest WTA rankings are 380 in singles and 248 in doubles.

At the 2008 Australian Open, Wlodarczak was given a wildcard into the singles qualifying, where she lost in the first round to Julia Schruff. She was also handed a wildcard into the doubles event with Marija Mirkovic, but they lost in the first round.

ITF Circuit finals

Singles: 3 (0–3)

Doubles: 14 (5–9)

External links
 
 
 

1987 births
Living people
Australian female tennis players
Australian people of Polish descent
Sportswomen from Victoria (Australia)
Tennis players from Melbourne